Rosh Hashanah is the Jewish new year.

Rosh Hashanah may also refer to:
Rosh Hashanah (tractate), a tractate of mishnah
Rosh Hashana kibbutz, a large prayer assemblage of Breslover Hasidim held on Rosh Hashanah

See also
Christian observances of Jewish holidays#Christian Feast of Trumpets